Khadijatou "Khaddi" Victoria Sagnia (born 20 April 1994) is a Swedish track and field athlete specialising in the long jump. Her personal bests in the event are 6.95 metres outdoors (Diamond League Nike Prefontaine Classic – Eugene, Oregon USA 2022) and 6.92 metres indoors (Glasgow 2018). She competes for Ullevi FK.

In 2021, Sagnia won the bronze medal in the long jump event at the European Indoors Championships in Torun, Poland with a leap of 6.75m. This was her first podium finish at the senior level. She won the gold medal in triple jump at the Youth Olympics in 2010. She has competed as a long jumper at the 2016 and 2020 Summer Olympic Games.

Biography
Growing up, Sagnia was very much into sports, participating in football, basketball, handball and even taekwondo.  In 2010, she competed at the Youth Olympic Games in Singapore, where she won the gold medal in the triple jump final.

Following her success at the Youth Olympic Games, she took part at the World Youth Championships in Lille, France.  However, she tore her ACL in her knee and was sidelined for two years.

In 2015, she returned to track and field taking part at the European Athletics Indoor Championships and the IAAF World Youth Championships.

Sagnia made it to the world stage when she represented Sweden at the 2016 Olympic Games in Rio de Janeiro, Brazil. Despite not having a very impressive performance at the games, she bounced back at the 2020 Olympic Games in Tokyo, Japan finishing in the 9th position.

Sagnia started with track and field in 2007 and has developed as an athlete at a very fast pace. Even before attending Youth Olympic Games she had represented the senior national team.

As well as being a Nike athlete, she is also an ambassador for Atea, Nocco Beverage and Gainomax health and lifestyle products.

Personal life
Her mother Sutay was born in Gambia but grew up in Sweden. Khaddi Sagnia has seven siblings.

Competition record

References

External links 
 
 
 Khaddi Sagnia Pro Career at Sportpersons.com
 

1994 births
Living people
Athletes (track and field) at the 2010 Summer Youth Olympics
Sportspeople from Helsingborg
Swedish people of Gambian descent
World Athletics Championships athletes for Sweden
Swedish female long jumpers
Swedish female triple jumpers
Athletes (track and field) at the 2016 Summer Olympics
Olympic athletes of Sweden
Youth Olympic gold medalists for Sweden
Youth Olympic gold medalists in athletics (track and field)
Athletes (track and field) at the 2020 Summer Olympics
21st-century Swedish women